Busto Arsizio Nord is a railway station in Italy. Located on the Saronno–Novara railway, it serves the city of Busto Arsizio. It is joined by a junction track to the Busto Arsizio railway station, managed by Rete Ferroviaria Italiana. Some kilometers west from the station, at Bivio Sacconago, is the origin of the branch to Malpensa. The train services are operated by Trenord and TiLo.

Train services
The station is served by the following services:

Malpensa Express services (MXP) Malpensa Airport - Saronno - Milan
Regional services TiLo (S50) Malpensa Airport - Gallarate - Laveno - Luino - Bellinzona
Regional services (Treno regionale) Novara - Busto Arsizio - Saronno - Milan

External links
 
 Ferrovienord official site - Busto Arsizio Nord railway station 

Railway stations in Lombardy
Nord Railway Station
Ferrovienord stations
Railway stations opened in 1887